Gyali ( "glass", also spelled Giali or Yali, pronounced ) is a volcanic Greek island in the Dodecanese, located halfway between the south coast of Kos (Kardamaina) and Nisyros. It consists of rhyolitic obsidian lava domes and pumice deposits (which are mined in huge quantities). No historical eruptions are known, but the most recent pumice eruptions overlie soils containing pottery and obsidian artifacts from the Neolithic period (10,000–4,500 BC). The island has two distinct segments, with the northeastern part almost entirely made of obsidian and the southwestern part of pumice. These are connected by a narrow isthmus and beach made of modern reef sediments. Anciently, the island was known as Istros.

Geography

It has a  cave. Parts of the island undergoing pumice strip mining are barren of vegetation. The 2001 census reported a resident population of 10 people. Administratively, it is part of the municipality of Nisyros. Its also popular for Perli, a thermo powder added in construction.

See also
List of volcanoes in Greece

References

External links

Official website of Municipality of Nisyros 

Islands of Greece
Dodecanese
Volcanoes of Greece
Volcanoes of the Aegean
Holocene lava domes
Potentially active volcanoes
Dormant volcanoes
Landforms of Kos (regional unit)
Islands of the South Aegean